The mayor of Managua is chief executive of the capital city of Nicaragua, with almost two million residents as of 2018. The mayor is chosen in the quadriennal Nicaraguan general elections. The incumbent is Reyna Rueda of the FSLN.

The city's other officials include the deputy mayor and the city council.

List of mayors 
1953-1956: Julio C. Quintana Villanueva
1954-1961: Gustavo Raskosky
1961-1963: Guillermo Lang
1963-1968: Humberto Ramírez Estrada
1968-1970: Arturo Cruz Porras
1970-1976 Luis Valle Olivares
1976-1979: Orlando Montenegro Medrano
1979-1980: Paul Atha Ramírez
1980-1985: Samuel Santos López – held office during the Junta of National Reconstruction; official title was "Minister of Reconstruction for Managua" 
1985-1988: Moisés Hassan
1988-1990 : Carlos Carrión Cruz – previously in charge of FSLN political operations in Managua, Carrión became Mayor when Hassan quit the FSLN 
1990-1995: Arnoldo Alemán – first mayor after FSLN defeat in 1990, elected with 52% of vote
1995-1996: Roberto Cedeño Borgen
1996-1997: Mirima Fonseca López
1997-2001: Roberto Cedeño Borgen
2001-2005: Herty Lewites 
 2005-2007: 
 2009-2009: Alexis Argüello – died in office
 2009-2018: Daysi Torres
 2018–present: Reyna Rueda –  elected on November 5, 2017 with 87.64% of the vote

References 

Mayors of Managua